The Battle of Sholinghur was fought on 27 September 1781 at Sholinghur,  West of Chennai (Madras), between forces of the Kingdom of Mysore led by Hyder Ali and East India Company forces led by General Eyre Coote. Haider Ali's forces were surprised by the company forces and they were expelled from the Carnatic with heavy casualties.

A battle honour, "Sholinghur", was awarded vide Gazette of India No 378 of 1889, which was awarded to fifteen units, seven of which are still in existence today. The battle honour is considered repugnant.

References

Sholinghur
Sholinghur 1781
Sholinghur 1781
1781 in India
Sholinghur
History of Tamil Nadu